Belfast Dock was a constituency of the Parliament of Northern Ireland.

Boundaries
Belfast Dock was a borough constituency comprising part of northern Belfast.  It was created in 1929 when the House of Commons (Method of Voting and Redistribution of Seats) Act (Northern Ireland) 1929 introduced first-past-the-post elections throughout Northern Ireland.

Belfast Dock was created by the division of Belfast East into four new constituencies. It survived unchanged, returning one member of Parliament, until the Parliament of Northern Ireland was temporarily suspended in 1972, and then formally abolished in 1973.

The boundaries were the same as the former Dock ward. This meant that the boundary ran from Carlisle Circus, along Clifton Street, up North Queen Street, along Great George's Street, along the Belfast Lough, along Brougham Street and Duncairn Gardens and from the top of Duncairn Gardens, along the Antrim Road to Carlisle Circus. Consequently, the constituency was almost identical to the current New Lodge ward.

The constituency is now part of Belfast North.

Politics
The constituency was one of the most marginal in the Northern Ireland Parliament changing hands at every election until 1965. In every election from 1933 to 1965 the incumbent member lost his seat.

Members of Parliament

Elections results

References

Northern Ireland Parliament constituencies established in 1929
Dock
Northern Ireland Parliament constituencies disestablished in 1973